The following is a complete list of extant original compositions by Cécile Chaminade.

All works are for one piano, two hands, unless otherwise stated.

The W numbers are taken from Citron (1988).

Works with opus number 
The table is ordered as follows: Opus No. – Title – Publisher – Date of composition or publication.

Op. 30 [Premier] Air de Ballet (Enoch) 1884
Op. 31 Trois Morceaux for violin and piano (Hainauer) 1885
 Andantino
 Romanza
 Bohémienne
Op. 31a Romanza for cello and piano (unpublished)
Op. 32 Guitare (Enoch) 1885
Op. 33 Valse-Caprice [Première Valse] (Enoch) 1885
Op. 34 Piano Trio No. 2 in A minor (Enoch) 1886
Op. 35 Six Études de Concert (Enoch) 1886
 Scherzo
 Automne
 Fileuse
 Appassionato
 Impromptu
 Tarentelle
Op. 35a Automne for piano duet (Enoch) 1924
Op. 35b Tarentelle for orchestra (unpublished)
Op. 36 Deux Pièces for 2 pianos (Enoch) 1886
 Intermède
 Pas des Cymbales [from Callirhoë]
Op. 36a idem for piano duet (Enoch) 1887
Op. 37 Callirhoë. Ballet symphonique for orchestra (unpublished) 1888
Op. 37a Callirhoë. Suite d'Orchestre (Enoch) 1890
 Prélude
 Pas du Voile
 Scherzettino
 Pas des Cymbales
Op. 37b Cinq Airs de Ballet [from Callirhoë] (Enoch) 1888
 Pas des Amphores (Deuxième Air de Ballet)
 Pas des Écharpes (Troisième Air de Ballet)
 Callirhoë (Variation) (Quatrième Air de Ballet)
 Danse Pastorale (Cinquième Air de Ballet)
 Danse Orientale
Op. 37c Deux Airs de Ballet [from Callirhoë] for piano duet (Enoch) 1888
 Danse Orientale
 Danse Pastorale
Op. 38 Marine (Enoch) 1886
Op. 39 Toccata (Enoch) 1887
Op. 40 Concertstück in C-sharp minor for piano and orchestra (Enoch) 1888
Op. 41 Pierrette. Air de Ballet (Enoch) 1889
Op. 42 Les Willis. Caprice (Enoch) 1889
Op. 43 Gigue (Enoch) 1889
Op. 44 Les Feux de la Saint-Jean for soloists, women's chorus and piano (Enoch) 1890
Op. 45 Sous l'Aile Blanche des Voiles for soloists, women's chorus and piano (Enoch) 1890
Op. 46 Pardon Breton for soloists, women's chorus and piano (Enoch) 1890
Op. 47 Noce Hongroise for soloists, women's chorus and piano (Enoch) 1890
Op. 48 Noël des Marins for soloists, women's chorus and piano (Enoch) 1890
Op. 49 Les Filles d'Arles for soloists, women's chorus and piano (Enoch) 1890
Op. 50 La Lisonjera (L'Enjôleuse) (Ricordi) 1890
Op. 51 La Livry. Air de Ballet (Ricordi) 1890
Op. 52 Capriccio Appassionato (Ricordi) 1890
Op. 53 Arlequine (Ricordi) 1890
Op. 54 Lolita. Caprice espagnol (Enoch) 1890
Op. 55 Pièces Romantiques for piano duet (Enoch) 1890
 Primavera
 La Chaise à Porteurs
 Idylle Arabe
 Sérénade d'Automne
 Danse Hindoue
 Rigaudon
Op. 55a La Chaise à Porteurs for violin and piano (Enoch) 1896
Op. 55b La Chaise à Porteurs for cello and piano (Enoch) 1896
Op. 55c Pièces Romantiques for piano solo (Enoch) 1923
 Idylle arabe
 Danse Hindoue
 Rigaudon
Op. 55d Pièces Romantiques for orchestra (unpublished)
 La Chaise à Porteurs
 Idylle arabe
 Sérénade d'Automne
Op. 56 Scaramouche (Enoch) 1890
Op. 57 Havanaise (Enoch) 1891
Op. 58 Mazurk' Suédoise (Enoch) 1891
Op. 59 Andante et Scherzettino [from Callirhoë] for 2 pianos (Enoch) 1889
Op. 60 Les Sylvains (Enoch) 1892
Op. 60a idem for violin and piano (Enoch) 1923
Op. 61 Arabesque (Enoch) 1892
Op. 62 Barcarolle for 2 voices and piano (Enoch) 1892
Op. 63 À travers Bois for 2 voices and piano (Enoch) 1892
Op. 64 Marthe et Marie for 2 voices and piano (Enoch) 1893
Op. 65 Nocturne pyrénéen for 2 voices and piano (Enoch) 1892
Op. 66 Studio (Enoch) 1878
Op. 67 La Morena. Caprice espagnol (Enoch) 1892
Op. 68 Les Fiancés for 2 voices and piano (Enoch) 1892
Op. 69 L'Angélus for 2 voices and piano (Enoch) 1893
Op. 70 Le Pêcheur et l'Ondine for 2 voices and piano (Enoch) 1893
Op. 71 Duo d'Étoiles for 2 voices and piano (Enoch) 1892
Op. 72 [missing]
Op. 73 Valse Carnavalesque for 2 pianos (Enoch) 1894
Op. 74 Pièce dans le Style Ancien (Enoch) 1893
Op. 74a idem for piano duet (Enoch) 1893
Op. 74b idem for violin and piano (Enoch) 1925
Op. 75 Danse Ancienne (Enoch) 1893
Op. 76 Six Romances sans Paroles (Enoch) 1893
 Souvenance
 Élévation
 Idylle
 Églogue
 Chanson Bretonne
 Méditation
Op. 76a idem for piano duet (Enoch) 1923
Op. 76b Chanson Bretonne for violin and piano (Enoch) 1924
Op. 77 Deuxième Valse (Enoch) 1895
Op. 78 Prélude for organ (Enoch) 1895
Op. 78a idem for piano (Enoch) 1895
Op. 79 Deux Pièces pour Orchestre (Enoch) 1895
 Le Matin
 Le Soir
Op. 79a idem for 2 pianos (Enoch) 1895
Op. 79b Le Matin for piano solo (Enoch) 1911
Op. 79c Le Matin for piano duet (Enoch) 1923
Op. 79d Le Matin for violin and piano (Enoch) 1925
Op. 80 Troisième Valse Brillante (Enoch) 1898
Op. 81 Terpsichore. Sixième Air de Ballet (Enoch) 1896
Op. 82 Chanson Napolitaine (Enoch) 1896
Op. 83 Ritournelle [after song] (Enoch) 1896
Op. 83a idem for piano duet (Enoch) 1896
Op. 83b idem for violin and piano (Enoch) 1903
Op. 84 Trois Préludes Mélodiques (Enoch) 1896
 A minor
 F major
 D minor
Op. 85 Vert-Galant (Enoch) 1896
Op. 86 Ballade (Enoch) 1896
Op. 87 Six Pièces Humoristiques (Enoch) 1897
 Réveil
 Sous Bois
 Inquiétude
 Autrefois
 Consolation
 Norvégienne
Op. 88 Rimembranza (Enoch) 1898
Op. 88a idem for piano duet (Enoch) 1923
Op. 89 Thème Varié (Enoch) 1898
Op. 90 Légende (Enoch) 1898
Op. 91 Quatrième Valse (Enoch) 1901
Op. 91a idem for piano duet (Enoch) 1923
Op. 92 Deuxième Arabesque (Enoch) 1898
Op. 93 Valse Humoristique (Enoch) 1906
Op. 94 Danse Créole (Deuxième Havanaise) (Enoch) 1898
Op. 94a idem for piano duet (Enoch) 1925
Op. 95 Trois Danses Anciennes (Enoch) 1899
 Passepied
 Pavane
 Courante
Op. 95a Pavane for piano duet (Enoch) 1899
Op. 96 Chant du Nord for violin and piano (Enoch) 1899
Op. 97 Rondeau for violin and piano (Enoch) 1899
Op. 98 Six Feuillets d'Album (Enoch) 1900
 Promenade
 Scherzetto
 Élégie
 Valse Arabesque
 Chanson Russe
 Rondo Allègre
Op. 99 Poèmes Évangéliques for women's chorus and piano (Enoch) 1903
 L'Étoile
 Les Humbles
 Les Pêcheurs
 La Jeune Fille
 Les Petits Enfants
 Sainte-Magdeleine
Op. 100 Aux Dieux Sylvains for women's chorus and piano (Enoch) 1900
Op. 101 L'Ondine (Enoch) 1900
Op. 101a idem for piano duet (Enoch) 1923
Op. 102 Joie d'Aimer for mezzo-soprano, baritone and piano (Enoch) 1900
Op. 103 Moment Musical (Enoch) 1900
Op. 103a idem for piano duet (Enoch) 1923
Op. 104 Tristesse (Enoch) 1901
Op. 105 Divertissement (Enoch) 1901
Op. 106 Expansion (Enoch) 1901
Op. 107 Concertino in D major for flute and orchestra (Enoch) 1902
Op. 108 Agitato (Enoch) 1902
Op. 109 Valse Militaire (Cinquième Valse) (Enoch) 1902
Op. 109a idem for piano duet (Enoch) 1902
Op. 110 Novelette (Enoch) 1903
Op. 111 Souvenirs Lointains (Enoch) 1903
Op. 112 Valse-Ballet (Sixième Valse) (Enoch) 1904
Op. 113 Caprice Humoristique (Enoch) 1904
Op. 114 Pastorale (Enoch) 1904
Op. 115 Valse Romantique (Septième Valse) (Enoch) 1905
Op. 115a idem for piano duet (Enoch) 1924
Op. 116 Sous le Masque (Enoch) 1905
Op. 117 Duo Symphonique for 2 pianos (Enoch) 1905
Op. 118 Étude Mélodique (Enoch) 1906
Op. 119 Valse Tendre (Enoch) 1906
Op. 120 Variations sur un Thème Original (Enoch) 1906
Op. 121 Deuxième Gavotte (Enoch) 1906
Op. 121a idem for piano duet (Enoch) 1906
Op. 122 Contes Bleus (Enoch) 1906
 D major
 G major
 B minor
Op. 122a Contes Bleus No.2 for piano duet (Enoch) 1923
Op. 123 Album des Enfants (première série) (Enoch) 1906
 Prélude
 Intermezzo
 Canzonetta
 Rondeau
 Gavotte
 Gigue
 Romance
 Barcarolle
 Orientale
 Tarentelle
 Air de Ballet
 Marche Russe
Op. 124 Étude Pathétique (Enoch) 1906
Op. 125 Sommeil d'Enfant for cello and piano [after song] (Enoch) 1907
Op. 126 Album des Enfants (deuxième série) (Enoch) 1907
 Idylle
 Aubade
 Rigaudon
 Églogue
 Ballade
 Scherzo-Valse
 Élégie
 Novelette
 Patrouille
 Villanelle
 Conte de Fées
 Valse Mignonne
Op. 127 Poème Provençal (Enoch) 1908
 Dans la Lande
 Solitude
 Le Passé
 Les Pêcheurs de Nuit
Op. 128 Pastel (Enoch) 1908
Op. 129 Menuet Galant (Enoch)1909
Op. 130 Passacaille (Enoch) 1909
Op. 131 Marche Américaine (Enoch) 1909
Op. 132 Étude Romantique (Enoch) 1909
Op. 133 Ronde du Crépuscule for soloists and women's chorus (Enoch) 1909
Op. 134 Le Retour (Enoch) 1909
Op. 135 La Barque d'Amour (Enoch) 1910
Op. 136 Capricietto (Enoch) 1910
Op. 137 Romance en Ré (Enoch) 1910
Op. 138 Étude Humoristique (Enoch) 1910
Op. 139 Étude Scolastique (Enoch) 1910
Op. 140 Aubade [after Op126/2] (Enoch) 1911
Op. 141 Suédoise (Enoch) 1911
Op. 142 Sérénade aux Étoiles for flute and piano (Enoch) 1911
Op. 143 Cortège (Enoch) 1911
Op. 144 Troisième Gavotte [after Op.126/3] (Enoch) 1911
Op. 145 Scherzo-Caprice (Enoch) 1912
Op. 146 Feuilles d'Automne (Enoch) 1912
Op. 147 Les Bohémiens. Scènes de Ballet (Enoch) 1913
Op. 148 Scherzo-Valse [after Op.126/6] (Enoch) 1913
Op. 149 Quatrième Gavotte (Enoch) 1913
Op. 150 Sérénade Espagnole [after song "Chanson espagnole"] (Enoch) 1895
Op. 150a idem for piano duet (Enoch) 1895
Op. 151 Écossaise (Enoch) 1914
Op. 152 Interlude (Enoch) 1914
Op. 152a idem for piano duet (Enoch) 1925
Op. 153 Caprice-Impromptu (Enoch) 1914
Op. 154 Sérénade Vénitienne (Enoch) 1914
Op. 155 Au Pays Dévasté (Enoch) 1919
Op. 156 Berceuse du Petit Soldat Blessé (Enoch) 1919
Op. 157 Chanson d'Orient (Enoch) 1919
Op. 158 Danse Païenne (Enoch) 1919
Op. 159 Les Elfes des Bois for soloists, women's chorus and piano (Enoch) 1920
Op. 160 Les Sirènes for soloists, mixed chorus and piano (Enoch) 1920
Op. 161 Chanson Nègre (Enoch) 1921
Op. 162 Cinquième Gavotte (Enoch) 1921
Op. 163 Romanesca (Enoch) 1923
Op. 164 Air à Danser (Enoch) 1923
Op. 165 Nocturne (Enoch) 1925
Op. 166 Berceuse Arabe (Enoch) 1925
Op. 167 Mass for two equal voices and organ or harmonium (Enoch) 1927
Op. 168 Dans l'Arène (Enoch) 1928
Op. 169 Valse d'Automne (Enoch) 1928
Op. 170 Air Italien (Au Pays Bleu) [after song] (Enoch) 1928
Op. 171 La Nef Sacrée. Recueil de pièces pour orgue ou harmonium (Enoch) 1928
 Offertoire (Au Christ-Roi)
 Offertoire (ou Communion)
 Offertoire (La Madone)
 Offertoire (Le 2 Novembre)
 Offertoire (pour une Messe de Mariage)
 Offertoire (pour la Toussaint)
 Quatre Pastorales (pour la Messe de Minuit)
 Marche Funèbre
 Cortège Nuptial

Works without opus number

Chamber

Andante, WU2 for violin and piano (unpublished) 1884
Andante Tranquillo, WU3 for violin and piano (unpublished) 1884
Concerto-Légende, WU10 for violin and piano (unpublished)
Portrait (Valse Chantée), W366b [after song] for violin and piano (Enoch) 1911

Orchestral

Les Deux Ménétriers, WU11 for baritone and orchestra (unpublished)
L'Été, WU14 for voice and orchestra (unpublished)

Songs for voice and piano

L'Absente, W271 (Enoch) 1886
À l'Inconnue, W288 (Enoch) 1892
L'Allée d'Émeraude et d'Or, W346 (Enoch) 1900
Alléluia, W357 (Enoch) 1901
Amertume, W333 (Enoch) 1898
Amoroso, W283 (Enoch) 1891
L'Amour Captif, W292 (Enoch) 1893
Amour d'Automne, W276 (Enoch) 1889
Amour Invisible, W376 (Enoch) 1905
L'Anneau d'Argent, W284 (Enoch) 1891
L'Anneau du Soldat, W392 (Enoch) 1916
Attente (Au Pays de Provence), W387 (Enoch) 1914
Aubade, W309 (Henri Tellier) 1894
Au Firmament, W352 (Enoch) 1901
Au Pays Bleu, W332 (Enoch) 1898
Auprès de ma Mie, W268 (Enoch) 1888
Avenir, W375 (Enoch) 1905
Avril s'Éveille, W323 (Enoch) 1896
Ballade à la Lune, W304 (Henri Tellier) 1894
Ballade à la Terre, WU5 (unpublished)
Le Beau Chanteur, W342 (Enoch) 1900
Berceuse, W287 (Enoch) 1892
Bleus, W328 (Enoch) 1898
Bonne Humeur, W363 (Enoch) 1903
C'était en Avril, W345 (Enoch) 1900
Chanson de Mer, W388 (Enoch) 1914
Chanson de Neige, W380 (Enoch) 1906
La Chanson du Fou, W335 (Hamelle) 1878
Chanson Espagnole, W315 (Enoch) 1895
Chanson Forestière, W367 (Enoch) 1904
Chanson Groënlandaise, W300 (Henri Tellier) 1894
Chanson Naïve, W381 (Enoch) 1907
Chanson Slave, W262 (Album du Gaulois) 1880
Chanson Triste, W329 (Enoch) 1898
Chant d'Amour, W305 (Henri Tellier) 1894
Charme d'Amour, W351 (Enoch) 1900
Le Ciel est Bleu, W320 (Enoch) 1895
Colette, W285 (Enoch) 1891
Console-moi, W348 (Enoch) 1900
Conte de Fées, W349 (Enoch) 1900
Couplets Bachiques, W325 (Enoch) 1896
La Damoiselle, W350 (Enoch) 1900
Départ, W369 (Enoch) 1904
Les Deux Cœurs (Chanson Bretonne), W295 (Enoch) 1893
Les Deux Ménétriers, W277 (Enoch) 1890
Dites-lui, W372 (Enoch) 1905
Écrin, W359 (Enoch) 1902
Espoir, W317 (Enoch) 1895
L'Été, W303 (Henri Tellier) 1894
Exil (Chanson Ancienne), W365 (Enoch) 1904
Extase, W343 (Enoch) 1900
La Fiancée du Soldat, W267 (Enoch) 1887
Fleur du Matin, W322 (Enoch) 1896
Fleur Jetée, W275 (Enoch) 1889
Fragilité, W274 (Enoch) 1889
L'Heure du Mystère, W257 (J. Maho) 1878
Les Heureuses, W382 (Enoch) 1909
L'Idéal, W269 (Enoch) 1888
Immortalité, W336 (Enoch) 1899
Infini, W360 (Enoch) 1902
Invocation, W291 (Enoch) 1893
Jadis, W337 (Enoch) 1899
Je Voudrais, W386 (Enoch) 1912
Lettres d'Amour, W383 (Enoch) 1910
La Lune Paresseuse, W377 (Enoch) 1905
Madeleine, W263 (Enoch) 1880
Madrigal, W266 (Enoch) 1886
Malgré Nous, W294 (Enoch) 1893
Mandoline, W319 (Enoch) 1895
Ma Première Lettre, W293 (Enoch) 1893
Menuet, W368 (Enoch) 1904
Mignonne, W302 (Henri Tellier) 1894
Mirage, W358 (Enoch) 1902
Mon Cœur Chante, W321 (Enoch) 1896
Mots d'Amour, W331 (Enoch) 1898
Ne Nos Inducas In Tentationem, WU21 (unpublished) 1878
N'est-ce pas?, W370 (Enoch) 1904
Nice la Belle, W273 (Enoch) 1889
Ninette, W258 (J. Maho) 1878
Le Noël des Oiseaux, W297 (Enoch) 1893
Nous nous Aimions, W344 (Enoch) 1900
Nuit d'Été, W326 (Enoch) 1896
Nuit Étoilée, W341 (Enoch) 1899
L'Ondine du Léman, W384 (Enoch) 1910
L'Orgue, W355 (Enoch) 1901
O Salutaris, WU22 for voice, violin and organ (unpublished)
Les Papillons, W259 (J. Maho) 1878
Partout, W316 (Enoch) 1895
Petits Cœurs, W347 (Enoch) 1900
Pièce Romantique, W327 [after Op. 9/1] (Durand) 1897
Plaintes d'Amour, W281 (Enoch) 1891
La plus Jolie, W354 (Enoch) 1901
Portrait (Valse Chantée), W366 for voice, flute and piano (Enoch) 1904
Pourquoi, W356 (Enoch) 1901
Les Présents, W330 (Enoch) 1898
Râvana (Ballade Aryenne), W312 (Enoch) 1895
Refrain de Novembre, W364 (Enoch) 1903
La Reine de mon Cœur, W378 (Enoch) 1905
Le Rendez-vous, W289 (Enoch) 1892
Ressemblance, W310 (Enoch) 1895
Reste, W338 (Enoch) 1899
Rêve d'un Soir, W278 (Enoch) 1890
Les Rêves, W280 (Enoch) 1891
Rêves défunts, W340 (Enoch) 1899
Ritournelle, W265 (Enoch) 1886
Ronde d'Amour, W311 (Enoch) 1895
Rosemonde, W298 (Henri Tellier) 1878
Roulis des Grèves, W361 (Enoch) 1902
Sans Amour, W318 (Enoch) 1895
Sérénade Sévillane, W299 (Henri Tellier) 1894
Serenata, W272 (Enoch) 1888
Ses Yeux, W374 (Enoch) 1905
Si j'étais Jardinier, W296 (Enoch) 1893
Sombrero, W301 (Henri Tellier) 1894
Sommeil d'Enfant, W362 (Enoch) 1903
Sonne, Clairon (Marche Militaire), W391 (Enoch) 1915
Son Nom, W371 (Enoch) 1904
Un Souffle a Passé, W379 (Enoch) 1906
Souhait, W264 (Enoch) 1886
Sous ta Fenêtre, W260 (J. Maho) 1878
Sur la Plage, W286 (Enoch) 1892
Te Souviens-tu?, W261 (J. Maho) 1878
Toi!, W314 (Enoch) 1895
Ton Sourire, W353 (Enoch) 1901
Trahison, W308 (Henri Tellier) 1894
Les Trois Baisers, W339 (Enoch) 1899
Le Trône du Vieux Roi, W389 (Enoch) 1914
Tu me Dirais, W282 (Enoch) 1891
Veux-tu?, W324 (Enoch) 1896
Viatique, W313 (Enoch) 1895
Vieille Chanson, W307 (Henri Tellier) 1894
Viens mon Bien-aimé, W290 (Enoch) 1892
Vieux Portrait, W279 (Enoch) 1890
Le Village, W390 (Enoch) 1915
Villanelle, W306 (Henri Tellier) 1894
Vœu Suprême, W385 (Enoch) 1910
Voisinage, W270 (Enoch) 1888
Voix du Large, W373 (Enoch) 1905
Vous Souvient-il?, W334 (Hamelle) 1898

Piano

La Capricieuse, WU7 (unpublished) c.1935–44
Comme Autrefois – Le Bon Vieux Temps, WU9 (unpublished) c.1935–44
La Fiancée du Soldat, W267a [after song] (Enoch) 1912
Le Gladiateur, WU15 (unpublished)
Légende du Vieux Manoir, WU18 (unpublished) c.1935–44
Portrait (Valse Chantée), W366a [after song] (Enoch) 1911
Souvenirs d'Enfance, WU27 (unpublished)
Les Tambourinaires. Danse Provençale, WU28 (unpublished)

Two pianos

Marche Hongroise, WU19 (unpublished) 1880

References
Adapted from:
Citron, Marcia J.: Cécile Chaminade: A Bio-Bibliography. Greenwood Press, 1988.

External links

 
Chaminade, Cecile